Fritz Steuri also known as Fritz Steuri II (1903 - 9 August 1955) was a Swiss alpine ski racer who competed at three editions of the FIS Alpine World Ski Championships (1931, 1932, 1933).

World Championship results

See also
 Fritz Steuri
 Fritz Steuri III

References

External links
 

1903 births
People from Grindelwald
1955 deaths
Swiss male alpine skiers